A roving bridge, changeline bridge, turnover bridge, or snake bridge is a bridge over a canal constructed to allow a horse towing a boat to cross the canal when the towpath changes sides. This often involved unhitching the tow line, but on some canals they were constructed so that there was no need to do this by placing the two ramps on the same side of the bridge (see middle photo), which turned the horse through 360 degrees. On the Macclesfield Canal this was achieved by building spiral ramps and on the Stratford-upon-Avon Canal and others by constructing roving bridges of iron in two cantilevered halves, leaving a slot in the middle for the tow rope. This was also called a split bridge. For cost reasons many ordinary Stratford bridges were also built in this way as they had no towpath.

Bridges were also necessary at canal junctions and where the towpath was interrupted by side arms. These are strictly speaking side bridges, but they are often referred to as roving bridges. Well-known ones occur at Hawkesbury Junction and Haywood Junction. The Birmingham Canal Navigations has many examples, mainly of cast iron, which took the towpaths across factory arms.

The ramps of the bridge are typically studded with alternating rows of protruding bricks to prevent the feet of the horse from sliding. The bridge may be constructed of cast iron (particularly in industrial areas) or of more conventional brick or stone.

See also

Canals of the United Kingdom
History of the British canal system
Mule ramp
Spiral bridge

References

Water transport infrastructure
Canals
Bridges by mode of traffic